Peace Be Still may refer to:

 Peace Be Still (Hope Darst album), 2020
 "Peace Be Still" (song), a 2020 single by Hope Darst
 Peace Be Still (James Cleveland album), 1963
 Peace Be Still (Vanessa Bell Armstrong album), 1983